Mastax pakistana is a species of beetle in the family Carabidae with restricted distribution in the Pakistan.

References

Mastax pakistana
Beetles of Asia
Beetles described in 1963